The Axeman of New Orleans was an unidentified American serial killer active in New Orleans, Louisiana, and surrounding communities, including Gretna, from May 1918 to October 1919. Press reports during the height of public panic about the killings mentioned similar murders as early as 1911, but recent researchers have called these reports into question. The Axeman was never identified, and the murders remain unsolved. He mainly targeted Italian immigrants and Italian-Americans. This leaves the possibility open that the killings were racially motivated, but as the killer was never caught, this was never conclusively proven.

Background
As the killer's epithet implies, the victims usually were attacked with an axe, which often belonged to the victims themselves. In most cases, a panel on a back door of a home was removed by a chisel, which along with the panel was left on the floor near the door. The intruder then attacked one or more of the residents with either an axe or straight razor. The crimes were not motivated by robbery, and the perpetrator never removed items from his victims' homes.

The majority of the Axeman's victims were Italian immigrants or Italian-Americans, leading many to believe that the crimes were ethnically motivated. Many media outlets sensationalized this aspect of the crimes, even suggesting Mafia involvement despite lack of evidence. Some crime analysts have suggested that the killings were related to sex, and that the murderer was perhaps a sadist specifically seeking female victims. Criminologists Colin and Damon Wilson hypothesize that the Axeman killed male victims only when they obstructed his attempts to murder women, supported by cases in which the woman of the household was murdered but not the man. A less plausible theory is that the killer committed the murders in an attempt to promote jazz music, suggested by a letter attributed to the killer in which he stated that he would spare the lives of those who played jazz in their homes.

The Axeman was not caught or identified, and his crime spree stopped as mysteriously as it had started. The murderer's identity remains unknown to this day, although various possible identifications of varying plausibility have been proposed. On March 13, 1919, a letter purporting to be from the Axeman was published in newspapers, saying that he would kill again at 15 minutes past midnight on the night of March 19 but would spare the occupants of any place where a jazz band was playing. That night all of New Orleans' dance halls were filled to capacity, and professional and amateur bands played jazz at parties at hundreds of houses around town. There were no murders that night.

Suspects

Crime writer Colin Wilson speculates the Axeman could have been Joseph Monfre, a man shot to death in Los Angeles in December 1920 by the widow of Mike Pepitone, the Axeman's last known victim. Wilson's theory has been widely repeated in other true crime books and websites. However, true crime writer Michael Newton searched New Orleans and Los Angeles public, police and court records as well as newspaper archives, and failed to find any evidence of a man with the name "Joseph Monfre" (or a similar name) having been assaulted or killed in Los Angeles.

Newton was also not able to find any information that Mrs. Pepitone (identified in some sources as Esther Albano, and in others simply as a "woman who claimed to be Pepitone's widow") was arrested, tried or convicted for such a crime, or indeed had been in California. Newton notes that "Momfre" was not an unusual surname in New Orleans at the time of the crimes. It appears that there actually may have been an individual named Joseph Momfre or Mumfre in New Orleans who had a criminal history, and who may have been connected with organized crime; however, local records for the period are not extensive enough to allow confirmation of this, or to positively identify the individual. Wilson's explanation is an urban legend, and there is no more evidence now on the identity of the killer than there was at the time of the crimes.

Two of the alleged "early" victims of the Axeman, an Italian couple named Schiambra, were shot by an intruder in their Lower Ninth Ward home in the early morning hours of May 16, 1912. The male Schiambra survived while his wife died. In newspaper accounts, the prime suspect is referred to by the name of "Momfre" more than once. While radically different than the Axeman's usual modus operandi, if Joseph Momfre was indeed the Axeman, the Schiambras may well have been early victims of the future serial killer.

According to scholar Richard Warner, the chief suspect in the crimes was Frank "Doc" Mumphrey (1875–1921), who used the alias Leon Joseph Monfre/Manfre.

Victims

 Joseph Maggio, an Italian grocer, and his wife Catherine were attacked on May 23, 1918, while sleeping alongside each other, at their home on the corner of Upperline and Magnolia Streets where they conducted a barroom and grocery. The killer broke into the home, and then proceeded to cut the couple's throats with a straight razor. Upon leaving he bashed their heads with an axe, perhaps in order to conceal the real cause of death. Joseph survived the attack, but died minutes after being discovered by his brothers, Jake and Andrew. In the apartment, law enforcement agents found the bloody clothes of the murderer, as he had obviously changed into a clean set of clothes before fleeing the scene. A complete search of the premises was not completed by police after the bodies were removed, yet later the bloody razor was found on the lawn of a neighboring property. Police ruled out robbery as motivation for the attacks, as money and valuables left in plain sight were not stolen by the intruder. The razor used to kill the couple was found to belong to Andrew Maggio, the brother of the deceased who conducted a barber shop on Camp Street. His employee, Esteban Torres, told police that Maggio had removed the razor from his shop two days prior to the murder, explaining that he had wanted to have a nick honed from the blade. Maggio, who lived in the adjoining apartment to his brother's residence, discovered his slain brother and sister-in-law roughly two hours after the gruesome attacks had occurred, upon hearing strange groaning noises through the wall. Maggio blamed his failure to hear any noise related to the attacks that had occurred in the early morning hours on his intoxicated state, as he had returned home after a night of celebration prior to his departure to join the navy; police, however, were nonetheless surprised that he failed to hear the intruder, as he made a forced entry into the home. Andrew Maggio became the police chief's prime suspect in the crime, yet was released after investigators were unable to break down his statement, as well as his account of an unknown man who was supposedly seen lurking near the residence prior to the murders.
 Catherine Maggio was the wife of Joseph Maggio. Her throat was cut so deeply that her head was nearly severed from her shoulders. Unlike Joseph, Catherine did not survive long after the attack, if at all, and died before her husband's brothers found them.
 Louis Besumer and his mistress Harriet Lowe were attacked in the early morning hours of June 27, 1918, in the quarters at the back of his grocery which was located at the corner of Dorgenois and Laharpe Streets. Besumer was struck with a hatchet above his right temple, which resulted in a possible skull fracture. Lowe was hacked over the left ear, and found unconscious when police arrived at the scene. The couple was discovered shortly after 7 AM on the morning of the attack by John Zanca, a driver of a bakery wagon who had come to the grocery in order to make a routine delivery. Zanca found both Besumer and Lowe in a puddle of their own blood, both bleeding from their heads. The axe, which had belonged to Besumer himself, was found in the bathroom of the apartment. Besumer later stated to police that he had been sleeping when he was bashed with the hatchet. Almost immediately, police arrested potential suspect Lewis Oubicon, a then 41-year-old African American man who had been employed in Besumer's store just a week before the attacks. No evidence existed which could have proved the man guilty, yet police arrested him nonetheless, stating that Oubicon had offered conflicting accounts of his whereabouts on the morning of the attack. Shortly after the attempted murder, Lowe stated that she remembered having been attacked by a mulatto man, yet her statement was discounted by police due to her disillusioned state. The robbery was said to be the only possible explanation for the attacks, yet no money or valuables were removed from the couple's home. Oubicon was later released as police were unable to gather sufficient evidence to hold him accountable for the crimes. Media attention soon turned to Besumer himself, as a series of letters written in German, Russian, and Yiddish were discovered in a trunk at the man's home. Police suspected that Besumer was a German spy, and government officials began a full investigation of his potential espionage. Weeks later, after going in and out of consciousness, Harriet Lowe told police that she thought Besumer was in fact a German spy, which led to his immediate arrest. Two days later Besumer was released, and two lead investigators of the case were demoted due to unacceptable police work. Besumer was once again arrested in August 1918, after Harriet Lowe, who lay dying in Charity Hospital after a failed surgery, stated that it was he who had attacked her more than a month previously with his hatchet. He was charged with murder, and served nine months in prison before being acquitted on May 1, 1919, after a ten-minute jury deliberation.
 Harriet Lowe was attacked while in bed with Louis Besumer. As mentioned previously, Lowe was hacked above her left ear and found unconscious at the scene of the crime before she was rushed to Charity Hospital. Lowe became the center of a media circus, as she continually made scandalous and often false statements relating to both the attacks and the character of Louis Besumer, some of which are described in the preceding description. The Times-Picayune sensationalized Lowe and her outspoken nature upon discovering that she was not the wife of Besumer, but his mistress. A Charity Hospital source discovered the scandal, when Besumer asked to be directed to the room of "Mrs. Harriet Lowe," and was inevitably denied access as no woman by that name was a patient. Besumer's legal wife arrived from Cincinnati in the days immediately following the discovery, which further inflamed the ongoing drama. Lowe further gained media attention as she repeatedly made statements which voiced her dislike of the New Orleans chief of police, as well as her reluctance to comply with police questioning. After the truth of her marital status was revealed publicly, Lowe told reporters from the Times-Picayune that she would no longer aid the police in their investigation, as she suspected that it had been Chief Mooney who first informed the press of the scandal. Despite the scandal, and her delirious statements which suggested that Besumer was a German spy, Lowe returned to the home she shared with Besumer weeks after the attack. One side of her face was partially paralyzed due to the severity of the attack. Lowe died August 5, 1918, just two days after doctors performed surgery in an effort to repair her partially paralyzed face. Just prior to her death, Lowe told authorities that she suspected it was Louis Besumer who had attacked her.
 Anna Schneider was attacked in the early evening hours of August 5, 1918. The 8 months pregnant, 28-year-old of Elmira Street awoke to find a dark figure standing over her and was bashed in the face repeatedly. Her scalp had been cut open, and her face was completely covered in blood. Mrs. Schneider was discovered after midnight by her husband, Ed Schneider, who was returning late from work. Schneider claimed that she remembered nothing of the attack, and gave birth to a healthy baby girl two days after the incident. Her husband told police that nothing was stolen from the home, besides six or seven dollars that had been in his wallet. The windows and doors of the apartment appear to have not been forced open, and authorities came to the conclusion that the woman was most likely attacked with a lamp that had been on a nearby table. James Gleason, who police said was an ex-convict, was arrested shortly after Schneider was found. Gleason was later released due to a complete lack of evidence, and stated that he originally ran from authorities because he had so often been arrested. Lead investigators began to publicly speculate that the attack was related to the previous incidents involving Besumer and Maggio.
 Joseph Romano was an elderly man living with his two nieces, Pauline and Mary Bruno. On August 10, 1918, Pauline and Mary awoke to the sound of a commotion in the adjoining room where their uncle resided. Upon entering the room, the sisters discovered that their uncle had taken a serious blow to his head, which resulted in two open cuts. The assailant was fleeing the scene as they arrived, yet the girls were able to distinguish that he was a dark-skinned, heavy-set man, who wore a dark suit and slouched hat. Romano, although seriously injured, was able to walk to the ambulance once it arrived, yet died two days later due to severe head trauma. The home had been ransacked, yet no items were stolen from Romano. Authorities found a bloody axe in the back yard and discovered that a panel on the back door had been chiseled away. The Romano murder created a state of extreme chaos in the city, with residents living in constant fear of an Axeman attack. Police received a slew of reports, in which citizens claimed to have seen an Axeman lurking in New Orleans neighborhoods. A few men even called to report that they had found axes in their back yards. John Dantonio, a then-retired Italian detective, made public statements in which he hypothesized that the man who had committed the Axeman murders was the same who had killed several individuals in 1911. The retired detective cited similarities in the manner by which the two sets of homicides had been committed, as reason to assume that they had been conducted by the same individual. Dantonio described the potential killer as an individual of dual personalities, who killed without motive. This type of individual, Dantonio stated, could very likely have been a normal, law-abiding citizen, who was often overcome by an overwhelming desire to kill. He later went on to describe the killer as a real-life "Dr. Jekyll and Mr. Hyde".
 Charles Cortimiglia was an Italian immigrant who lived with his wife, Rosie, and infant daughter, Mary, on the corner of Jefferson Avenue and Second Street in Gretna, Louisiana, a New Orleans suburb across the Mississippi River. On the night of March 10, 1919, screams were heard coming from the Cortimiglia residence. Grocer Iorlando Jordano rushed across the street to investigate. Upon his arrival, Jordano noticed that Charles Cortimiglia, his wife, and their daughter had all been attacked by the unknown intruder. Rosie stood in the doorway with a serious head wound, clutching her deceased daughter. Charles lay on the floor, bleeding profusely. The couple was rushed to Charity Hospital, where it was discovered that both had suffered skull fractures. Nothing was stolen from the house, but a panel on the back door had been chiseled away and a bloody axe was found on the back porch of the home. Charles was released two days later, while his wife remained in the care of doctors. Upon gaining full consciousness, Rosie made claims that Iorlando Jordano and his 18-year-old son, Frank, were responsible for the attacks. Iorlando, a 69-year-old man, was in too poor of health to have committed the crimes. Frank Jordano, more than six feet tall and weighing over 200 pounds, would have been too large to have fit through the panel on the back door. Charles Cortimiglia vehemently denied his wife's claims, yet police nonetheless arrested the two and charged them with the murder. The men would later be found guilty. Frank was sentenced to hang, and his father to life in prison. Charles Cortimiglia divorced his wife after the trial. Almost a year later, Rosie announced that she had falsely accused the two out of jealousy and spite. Her statement was the only evidence against the Jordanos, and they were released from jail shortly thereafter.
 Rosie Cortimiglia was the wife of immigrant laborer Charles Cortimiglia. She was attacked alongside her husband on March 10, 1919, while sleeping with her baby in her arms. She was badly wounded by the Axeman, but survived the incident.
 Mary Cortimiglia was the two-year-old daughter of Charles and Rosie Cortimiglia. She was killed while sleeping in her mother's arms with a single blow to the back of the neck when she and her parents were attacked on March 10, 1919.
 Steve Boca, a grocer, was attacked in his bedroom as he slept by an axe-wielding intruder on August 10, 1919. Boca awoke during the night to find a dark figure looming over his bed. Upon regaining consciousness, Boca ran to the street to investigate the intrusion, and found that his head had been cracked open. The grocer ran to the home of his neighbor, Frank Genusa, where he lost consciousness and collapsed. Nothing had been taken from the home, yet, once again, a panel on the back door of the home had been chiseled away. Boca recovered from his injuries, but could not remember any details of the trauma. This attack took place after the emergence of the infamous Axeman letter.
 Sarah Laumann was attacked on the night of September 3, 1919. Neighbors came to check on the young woman, who had lived alone, and broke into the home when Laumann did not answer. They discovered the 19-year-old lying unconscious on her bed, suffering from a severe head injury and missing several teeth. The intruder had entered the apartment through an open window, and attacked the woman with a blunt object. A bloody axe was discovered on the front lawn of the building. Laumann recovered from her injuries, yet couldn't recall any details from the attack.
 Mike Pepitone was attacked on the night of October 27, 1919. His wife was awakened by a noise and arrived at the door of his bedroom just as a large, axe-wielding man was fleeing the scene. Mike Pepitone had been struck in the head, and was covered in his own blood. Blood spatter covered the majority of the room, including a painting of the Virgin Mary. Mrs. Pepitone, the mother of six children, was unable to describe any characteristics of the killer. The Pepitone murder was the last of the alleged Axeman attacks.

In popular culture 

In 1919, local tune writer Joseph John Davilla wrote the song, "The Mysterious Axman's Jazz (Don't Scare Me Papa)". Published by New Orleans based World's Music Publishing Company, the cover depicted a family playing music with frightened looks on their faces.
The 1945 book Gumbo Ya-Ya, A Collection of Louisiana Folk Tales includes a chapter on the Axeman entitled "Axeman's Jazz", which helped spark renewed interest in the murders. The book also reproduced the cover of the 1919 sheet music.
The Australian rock band Beasts of Bourbon released an album in 1984 called The Axeman's Jazz.
Writer Julie Smith used a fictionalized version of the Axeman events in her 1991 novel The Axeman's Jazz.
The Axeman killings are also referred to in the short story "Mussolini and the Axeman's Jazz" by Poppy Z. Brite, published in 1997.
In Chuck Palahniuk's 2005 novel Haunted, the Axeman is mentioned in Sister Vigilante's short story.
The 2007 song "Deathjazz" by Las Vegas progressive rock band One Ton Project parallels the story of the Axeman.
A sentence from the Axeman's letter to The Times-Picayune is spoken at the beginning of Fila Brazillia's song "Tunstall and Californian Haddock."
Christopher Farnsworth's 2012 novel Red, White, and Blood centers on a murderous spirit called the Boogeyman, which has inhabited numerous bodies throughout history, including the Axeman of New Orleans.
Ray Celestin's 2014 novel The Axeman's Jazz is a fictionalized version of the Axeman of New Orleans's case.
In American Horror Story: Coven, starting with episode "The Axeman Cometh", the Axeman is portrayed by Danny Huston.
The Axeman is mentioned in Season 3, Episode 5 and Season 4, Episode 6 of The Originals.
The Axeman is portrayed in Hildred Rex's short story, A Slinking Agent of the Devil (at 3AM), Opus 1 of the dark fiction anthology, The Egg.
My Favorite Murder, a true crime podcast, covered the story of the Axeman on their 60th episode entitled "Jazz It".
Last Podcast on the Left covered the Axeman as part of their first episode on unsolved serial murders, titled "Unsolved Serial Murders Part 1: The Phantom, the Axe, and the Torso".
Stuff You Missed In History Class did a two-part miniseries on the Axeman in which they toyed with the idea of his murderous acts having begun prior to 1918.
Unsolved Murders, a true crime podcast, did a three-part miniseries on the Axeman of New Orleans, ending with their opinions of who the hosts think were responsible.
 And That's Why We Drink, a paranormal and true crime podcast, did an episode on The Axeman on its 39th episode, "A Girl Named German and La La Land 1 1/2."
 On the 13th Eisregen released the song "Axtmann", who tells of the crime.
BuzzFeed Unsolved, a YouTube series that delves into unsolved true crime cases and the supernatural, explored stories and theories regarding the Axeman in S2E1, "The Terrifying Axeman of New Orleans".
Alan G. Gauthreaux, author and historian, presented a comprehensive profile of the Axeman Murders in his book, Italian Louisiana: History, Heritage, and Tradition, published in 2014.
Last Week Tonight with John Oliver, a news satire program, mentioned The Axeman on episode 13 of season 6, titled "Medical Devices." John Oliver gave a brief history of the Axeman after showing a DePuy sales team celebrating their successful numbers for a hip device, which would later be recalled. The celebration was Mardi Gras themed, and included a man dressed up as The Axeman.
The American swing revival band Squirrel Nut Zippers released a song called "Axeman Jazz (Don't Scare Me Papa)" on their 2018 album, Beasts of Burgundy.
 In the virtual reality game The Walking Dead: Saints and Sinners multiple references to the Axeman can be found. A character references him in dialogue, and a special ax can be found in a safe with the phrase "the Axeman cometh" on the side. There is a reference to him liking jazz, as well as his famous quote from the infamous Axeman's Letter which is used to describe the special axe that can be found, known as the Esteemed Mortal. The Axeman's first physical appearance in game was "The Walking Dead: Saints & Sinners – Chapter 2: Retribution"
 The 2022 YA horror novel Don’t Go to Sleep by librarian Bryce Moore blends a fictionalized account with real facts, such as victim names, crime scene locations, and the real letter from the Axeman to the press.

See also 
 Clementine Barnabet, early 20th century Louisiana voodoo priestess and axe murderer.

 List of serial killers in the United States

References

Bibliography
 
 
 
 
 The Axman Came from Hell

External links
Vice interview of Miriam C. Davis about the Axeman murders
Prairie Ghosts: The Axeman of New Orleans
1919: A serial killer had New Orleans on edge Times-Picayune
Fresh Hell Podcast: The Axeman of New Orleans
The murder mystery behind the crazed Axeman of New Orleans

1918 crimes in the United States
1918 in Louisiana
1919 crimes in the United States
1919 in Louisiana
20th century in New Orleans
American murderers of children
American serial killers
Axe murder
History of Louisiana
Mass stabbings in the United States
Murder in Louisiana
People from New Orleans
Unidentified American serial killers
Unsolved murders in the United States